Mating Call is an album by jazz pianist Roberto Magris recorded in Los Angeles, released on the JMood label in 2010, and featuring performances by the Roberto Magris Quintet with Paul Carr, Michael O’Neill, Elisa Pruett and Idris Muhammad. The track list also includes a new version of Mating Call, the composition by Tadd Dameron from his album with John Coltrane.

Reception

The All About Jazz review by Edward Blanco awarded the album 4½ stars and simply states: "The music here is not typical or ordinary; it is creative, quite entertaining and superbly performed by all." The All About Jazz review by Jack Bowers awarded the album 4 stars and simply states: "Italian pianist Roberto Magris' quintet is world-class in every respect, consistently affirming its singular prowess on Mating Call. If musical excellence is more important to you than names, check out the Roberto Magris Quintet. Chances are you'll be pleasantly surprised."

Track listing
 "Optional Man" (Roberto Magris) - 10:18 
 "Hill of Illusions" (Roberto Magris) - 10:17 
 "Lament" (J.J. Johnson) - 8:38 
 "Theme for Ernie" (Fred Lacey) - 8:09 
 "Mating Call" (Tadd Dameron) - 13:32 
 "Europlane Blues" (Roberto Magris) - 5:58 
 "Lonely Town" (Leonard Bernstein) - 7:55

Personnel

Musicians
Paul Carr – tenor sax, soprano sax
Michael O’Neill – tenor sax
Roberto Magris - piano, electric piano
Elisa Pruett - bass
Idris Muhammad - drums

Production
 Paul Collins – executive producer and producer
 Samur Khouja and Eric Corne – engineering
 Amanda Reece – design
 Jerry Lockett – photography

References

Roberto Magris albums
2010 albums